BLADE (Block All Drive-by Download Exploits) is a computer program that was developed by Phillip Porras and Vinod Yegneswaran at SRI International; and Long Lu and Wenke Lee at the Georgia Institute of Technology. BLADE is funded by grants from the National Science Foundation, the United States Army Research Laboratory, and the Office of Naval Research. The program is designed to prevent drive-by download malware attacks.

References

External links
 

SRI International software
Computer security software